Events from the year 1840 in the United Kingdom.

Incumbents
 Monarch – Victoria
 Prime Minister – William Lamb, 2nd Viscount Melbourne (Whig)
 Foreign Secretary –  Henry John Temple, 3rd Viscount Palmerston
 Parliament – 13th

Events

 1 January – trial of Welsh Chartists John Frost, Zephaniah Williams and William Jones for their part in the Newport Rising of 1839 opens at Monmouth before Chief Justice Tindal. This is the first trial where proceedings are recorded in shorthand.
 10 January – Uniform Penny Post introduced, replacing the Uniform Fourpenny Post of 1839.
 12 January – Chartist rising in Sheffield aborted.
 14 January – Chartist rising in the East End of London largely suppressed by police.
 16 January – Frost, Williams and Jones are all found guilty of high treason for their part in the Chartist riots, and are sentenced to death; the last time the sentence of hanging, drawing and quartering is passed in the U.K., although following a nationwide petitioning campaign and direct lobbying of the Home Secretary by the Lord Chief Justice, it is commuted to transportation for life (Frost is eventually pardoned).
 22 January – British colonists reach New Zealand. Official founding date of Wellington.
 26 January – Chartist rising in Bradford fails to spread.
 6 February – Treaty of Waitangi, a document granting British sovereignty in New Zealand, is signed.
 10 February – Queen Victoria marries her cousin Prince Albert of Saxe-Coburg and Gotha in the Royal Chapel at St James's Palace.
 15 April – King's College Hospital opens in Portugal Street, London.
 27 April – the foundation stone of the new Palace of Westminster is laid as its reconstruction following the Burning of Parliament in 1834 begins (completed in 1860).
 1 May – issue of the Penny Black, the world's first postage stamp, together with Mulready stationery. The stamp becomes valid for prepayment of postage from 6 May.
  5 May - Thomas Carlyle gives the first lecture in the series On Heroes, Hero Worship and the Heroic in History
 11 May – Chartist leader Feargus O'Connor is sentenced to imprisonment in York Castle for seditious libel over speeches published in The Northern Star.
 20 May – York Minster's nave roof is destroyed in an accidental fire.
 6 June – the first group of British emigrants from the Church of Jesus Christ of Latter-day Saints set sail from Liverpool bound for Nauvoo, Illinois.
 10 June – Edward Oxford fires a pistol at Queen Victoria in Hyde Park, London.
 12–23 June – the World Anti-Slavery Convention is organised by the British and Foreign Anti-Slavery Society at Exeter Hall in London.
 July
 Fresh water is piped to Buxton Market Place by the 6th Duke of Devonshire, beginning the Buxton well dressing festival.
 Last known great auk in the British Isles caught and later killed on the islet of Stac an Armin, St Kilda, Scotland.
 4 July – the Cunard Line's 700-ton wooden paddle steamer  departs from Liverpool bound for Halifax, Nova Scotia, on the first steam transatlantic passenger mail service.
 15 July – Austria, Britain, Prussia, and Russia sign the London Treaty with the Sublime Porte, ruler of the Ottoman Empire.
 23 July
 The Province of Canada is created by the Act of Union.
 Vaccination Act provides for free vaccination for the poor and prohibits variolation.
 7 August – Chimney Sweepers and Chimneys Regulation Act 1840 prohibits the employment of children under the age of 21 as chimney sweeps.
 10 September – Ottoman and British troops bombard Beirut and land troops on the coast to pressure Egyptian Muhammad Ali to retreat from the country.
 16 September – Joseph Strutt hands over the deeds and papers concerning the Derby Arboretum, which is to become England's first public park.
 30 September – foundation of Nelson's Column laid in London, Trafalgar Square being laid out (as a hectare) and paved during the year.
 11 October – Maronite leader Bashir Shihab II surrenders to the Ottomans (in alliance with the British) and on 14 October goes into exile, initially in Malta.
 10 November – the boiler of an experimental steam locomotive named Surprise explodes near Bromsgrove station in Worcestershire, killing the driver, Thomas Scaife, and fireman, Joseph Rutherford.
 8 December – David Livingstone leaves for Africa.
 21 December – Stockport Viaduct is completed. It is one of the largest brick structures in Europe.

Undated
 The Royal Society for the Prevention of Cruelty to Animals gains its Royal status.
 Smallpox epidemic of 1837–40 ends, leaving more than 41,600 dead.

Ongoing events
 First Opium War (1839–1842)
 First Anglo-Afghan War (1839–1842)

Publications
 W. Harrison Ainsworth's novels Guy Fawkes and The Tower of London (both serialised).
 Charles Dickens' novel The Old Curiosity Shop (serialised).
 "Thomas Ingoldsby"'s The Ingoldsby Legends (first collected in book form).
 Agnes Strickland's Lives of the Queens of England begins publication.
 William Makepeace Thackeray's novel Catherine.
 William Whewell's book The Philosophy of the Inductive Sciences, founded upon their history, in which he introduces the words "Physicist" and (for the second time) "Scientist".

Births

 1 January – Dugald Drummond, railway locomotive engineer (died 1912)
 18 January – Henry Austin Dobson, poet and essayist (died 1921)
 26 January – John Clayton Adams, landscape painter (died 1906)
 5 February – John Boyd Dunlop, inventor (died 1921)
 29 February – John Philip Holland, inventor (died 1914)
 30 March – Charles Booth, shipowner and social reformer (died 1916)
 31 March – Benjamin Baker, civil engineer (died 1907)
 27 April – Edward Whymper, mountaineer (died 1911)
 2 June – Thomas Hardy, novelist and poet (died 1928)
 20 June – George Selwyn Marryat, fly fisherman (died 1896)
 21 June – Edward Stanley Gibbons, philatelic stamp dealer (died 1913)
 9 October – Simeon Solomon, painter (died 1905)
 21 November – Victoria, Princess Royal (died 1901)
 29 November – Rhoda Broughton, fiction writer (died 1920)

Deaths
 6 January – Frances Burney, novelist (born 1752)
 18 February – Sir Jeffry Wyattville, architect and garden designer (born 1766)
 30 March – Beau Brummell, arbiter of fashion (born 1778)
 7 April – William Heath, caricaturist (born 1794)
 15 April – Thomas Drummond, army officer, civil engineer and public official (born 1797)
 1 May – Joseph Williamson, philanthropist and builder of Williamson's tunnels (born 1769)
 26 May – Sidney Smith, admiral (born 1764)
 28 July – John Lambton, 1st Earl of Durham (born 1792)
 22 September
 Princess Augusta Sophia of the United Kingdom (born 1768)
 Anne Lister, landowner, diarist, mountaineer and traveller, "the first modern lesbian" (born 1791)

See also
 1840 in Scotland

References

 
Years of the 19th century in the United Kingdom